The 1899 Edinburgh East by-election was a parliamentary by-election for the House of Commons constituency of Edinburgh East in Edinburgh, Scotland held on 23 June 1899. It was triggered by the death of Liberal MP Robert Wallace.

Previous election

Result

References

See also 

 Lists of United Kingdom by-elections

1899 elections in the United Kingdom
1899 in Scotland
1890s elections in Scotland
June 1899 events
1890s in Edinburgh
By-elections to the Parliament of the United Kingdom in Edinburgh constituencies